= Kaveri Nagar =

Human settlement in India

Kaveri Nagar (Tamil: காவேரி நகர்) is a neighbourhood of the city of Tiruchirappalli in Tamil Nadu, India.
